The Bevo Francis Award is a college basketball award given annually since 2016. The award recognizes the top small college basketball player in the United States for a given season. The award is named after the late Bevo Francis, who earned national acclaim and All-American status for Rio Grande College in the 1950s.

Eligible players must come from below NCAA Division I. Players are eligible if the play in the following college basketball divisions:

NCAA Division II
NCAA Division III
NAIA Division I
NAIA Division II
USCAA Division I
USCAA Division II
NCCAA Division I
NCCAA Division II

The first winner was Dominez Burnett of Davenport University. Only one school, Northwest Missouri State University, has won the award more than once.

Winners

Winners by school

References

External links
Official site

Awards established in 2016
College basketball trophies and awards in the United States
2016 establishments in the United States